Le Temps des bouffons (French for Time of the Buffoons) is a short film created (and narrated) in 1985 by Québécois director Pierre Falardeau.

It compares English rule in Ghana with Canadian dominance in Quebec by showing the 200th anniversary celebration of the Beaver Club of Montreal. Falardeau speaks slowly and angrily during scenes of the Canadian élite laughing and toasting each other, some in pseudo-Colonial costume.

The film was shot in 1985 but never shown until 1993.

External links
Panorama -- Le Temps des bouffons (1985) (Review in French)
Text of the film (in French)
Description in English

1985 films
Films shot in Montreal
Quebec films
Canadian short documentary films
Films directed by Pierre Falardeau
French-language Canadian films
1980s Canadian films